Josaly or Zhosaly is an urban-type settlement in the Kyzylorda Region, Kazakhstan. It is the administrative center of Karmakshy District (KATO code - 434630100). Population:

Geography
Josaly is located on the right bank of the Syr Darya river, close to the western limit of the Daryalyktakyr plain.

References

External links

Populated places in Kyzylorda Region